The Commonwealth Water Polo Championships are held in conjunction with the Commonwealth Games, although they are no longer included in the Commonwealth Games programme. They are in a round robin format.

Water polo and the Commonwealth Games 
Although recognised as a Commonwealth Games Federation (CGF) sport, water polo has only featured in the Games once at the 1950 British Empire Games in Auckland, New Zealand. Only Australia and New Zealand took part, where Australia won all three matches: 11-4, 13-2, 5-2. Water polo is acknowledged by the CGF as a sport for potential inclusion in future Games with further development in Commonwealth countries.

Manchester 2002
The first Commonwealth Water Polo Championships were held in March 2002 at Manchester Aquatics Centre in Manchester, England. Five teams entered in the women's championships, and nine in the men's. The championships were held prior to the July/August 2002 Commonwealth Games in Manchester.

Commonwealth Water Polo Championships Placings - Women:
 Australia
 Canada
 England
 Northern Ireland
 South Africa
Commonwealth Water Polo Championships Placings - Men:
 Canada
 Australia
 England
 Malta
 New Zealand
 Singapore
 South Africa
 Northern Ireland
 Wales

Perth 2006
The second Commonwealth Water Polo Championships were held in January 2006 at Challenge Stadium in Perth, Australia. The championships were held two months prior to the 2006 Commonwealth Games in Melbourne.

Commonwealth Water Polo Championships Placings - Women:
 Australia
 Canada
 New Zealand
 England
 South Africa
 Scotland
 Singapore

Commonwealth Water Polo Championships Placings - Men:
 Australia
 Canada
 New Zealand
 South Africa
 England
 Wales
 Singapore

Aberdeen 2014
The third Commonwealth Championships took place from April 5–12, 2014 after an 8-year gap, where no competition was held in conjunction with the 2010 Commonwealth Games in Delhi, India. The location was Aberdeen, Scotland at the newly built Aberdeen Aquatics Centre. The Championships were held prior to the 2014 Commonwealth Games in Glasgow.

Seven teams competed in the men's competition, and six in the women's.

Commonwealth Water Polo Placings - Women:
 England
 Canada
 South Africa
 Scotland
 Wales
Commonwealth Water Polo Placings - Men:
 England
 Malta
 Scotland
 South Africa
 New Zealand
 Wales
 Singapore

Malta 2018
Malta were due to host the 2018 Championships from 23-30 September, but in June 2018 decided they were unable to host, leaving too short a time to plan an alternative.  The 2018 Championships therefore did not take place.

All-time medal table

References

Water Polo
International water polo competitions
Sports at the Commonwealth Games